The Figurehead is a 1920 American silent drama film directed by Robert Ellis and starring Eugene O'Brien, Anna Q. Nilsson and Ora Carew.

Cast
 Eugene O'Brien as 	Sheridan Dow
 Anna Q. Nilsson as Mary Forbes
 Ora Carew as 	Sylvia Freeman
 Edwin Stevens as Frank Freeman
 Joseph W. Girard as James Durfee 
 Frances Parks as Kitty
 Kate Price as 	Mrs. Devlin

References

Bibliography
 Connelly, Robert B. The Silents: Silent Feature Films, 1910-36, Volume 40, Issue 2. December Press, 1998.
 Munden, Kenneth White. The American Film Institute Catalog of Motion Pictures Produced in the United States, Part 1. University of California Press, 1997.

External links
 

1920 films
1920 drama films
1920s English-language films
American silent feature films
Silent American drama films
American black-and-white films
Films directed by Robert Ellis
Selznick Pictures films
1920s American films